The Lockheed XP-49 (company Model 522) was an advancement on the P-38 Lightning for a fighter in response to U.S. Army Air Corps proposal 39-775. Intended to use the new 24-cylinder Pratt & Whitney X-1800 engine, this proposal, which was for an aircraft substantially similar to the P-38, was assigned the designation XP-49, while the competing Grumman Model G-46 was awarded second place and designated XP-50.

History
Ordered in October 1939 and approved on January 8, 1940, the XP-49 was to feature a pressurized cockpit and armament of two  cannon and four  machine guns. Two months into the contract, a decision was made to substitute the Continental XI-1430-1 (or IV-1430) for the X-1800. The XP-49, 40-3055, first flew on 11 November 1942. The prototype force-landed on 1 January 1943, when the port landing gear failed to lock down due to combined hydraulic and electrical system failures. The XP-49 next flew 16 February 1943, after repairs were made. Preliminary flight data showed performance was not sufficiently better than the production P-38, especially given the questionable future of the XI-1430 engine, to warrant disruption of the production line to introduce the new model aircraft. Consideration of quantity production was therefore abandoned.

The aircraft was flown to Wright Field, and after various problems, further work on the XP-49 was halted, and Lockheed focused their energies on improving the P-38 instead.

Specifications (XP-49)

See also

References

Citations

Bibliography

 Green, William. War Planes of the Second World War, Volume Four: Fighters. London: MacDonald & Co. (Publishers) Ltd., 1961 (Sixth impression 1969). .
 Green, William and Swanborough, Gordon. WW2 Aircraft Fact Files: US Army Air Force Fighters, Part 2. London: Macdonald and Jane's Publishers Ltd., 1978. .

External links

P-049
Lockheed P-49
Twin-boom aircraft
Cancelled military aircraft projects of the United States
Mid-wing aircraft
Aircraft first flown in 1942
Twin piston-engined tractor aircraft